Jocinei Schad, simply known as Jocinei, (born 4 February 1990 in Timbó) is a Brazilian football player who plays for Felda United as a central midfielder.

Career
Jocinei started his youth career with Joinville, he played with them before being promoted into the first-team in 2010. He remained with Joinville for two years before leaving in 2012 after making just 4 appearances. Towards the end of his stay with Joinville, he was loaned out to América-SP. After his departure from Joinville, Jocinei agreed to join Piracicaba but left a few months later to join Ponte Preta. A move to Rio Claro followed.

After short spells with Ponte Preta and Rio Claro, he joined current club Coimbra. Despite joining in 2013, he has yet to appear in a league fixture for the club and has been loaned out five times. The first temporary transfer away from Coimbra was to Corinthians with whom he made his debut for against one of his future teams, Portuguesa. He made a total of three Série A appearances, followed by three in the 2014 Campeonato Paulista.

Jocinei then returned to Coimbra before joining Portuguesa. He appeared in 17 Série B matches for Portuguesa, scoring once versus Luverdense in August 2014. Red Bull Brasil became Jocinei's third loan spell in a year as he joined the São Paulo-based club for the Campeonato Paulista. A loan to Bragantino came next in 2015 before Jocinei joined Figueirense of Série A in 2016, also on loan.

Honours
Joinville
 Campeonato Brasileiro Série C: 2011

References

External links

Living people
1990 births
Brazilian footballers
Association football midfielders
Campeonato Brasileiro Série A players
Campeonato Brasileiro Série B players
Joinville Esporte Clube players
América Futebol Clube (SP) players
Esporte Clube XV de Novembro (Piracicaba) players
Associação Atlética Ponte Preta players
Rio Claro Futebol Clube players
Sport Club Corinthians Paulista players
Associação Portuguesa de Desportos players
Red Bull Brasil players
Clube Atlético Bragantino players
Figueirense FC players